Sports in Barbados are many and varied. The large Barbadian diaspora around the globe and wide-scale availability of International television covered on the local cable service and DirectTV has meant that Barbadians have always been up to date on international trends. Barbadians now follow a wide cross-section of sport from around the world. In recent years, the Barbadian government has implemented a policy of sport-based tourism. Including the hosting of the 2007 Cricket World Cup and various other events locally. Beyond this, the Barbadian calendar has many sporting events throughout the year.

Athletics
Obadele Thompson won a bronze medal in the 100m at the 2000 Summer Olympic Games. He's the first and only Bajan to win an Olympic medal. He is also the only Bajan to run sub 10 and sub 20 over 100m and 200m.

Ryan Brathwaite won the gold medal in the 110 metres hurdles at the 2009 World Championships in Athletics in Berlin.

Ramon Gittens won a bronze medal at the 2016 IAAF World Indoor Championships, as well as the 100m silver medal at the 2015 Pan American Games.

Greggmar Swift won a bronze medal at the 2014 Central American and Caribbean Games

Shane Brathwaite won a gold medal in the octathlon at the 2007 World Youth Championships in Athletics. This is the first Bajan gold medal at a global athletics championship. Brathwaite also won Gold at the 2019 Pan American Games and Bronze at the 2015 Pan American Games.

Akela Jones won a bronze in the women's high jump at the Pan American Games. 

Olympian Sada Williams is the National record holder over 200m and 400m. She's a Multiple Carifta Games Champion. She ran a national record 50.11 over the distance at the 2020 Olympic Games. 

Andrea Blackett was the 1998 Commonwealth Games Champion over 400m hurdles. She also placed fourth in the Women's 400 metres Hurdles event at the 1999 IAAF World Championships in Seville, Spain.

Olympian Jonathan Jones is the first Bajan to run under 45 seconds over 400m. He holds the national record with a time of  44.64.

Mario Burke won bronze medal in the 100 metres at 2016 World Junior Championships in Athletics. He is only the second Bajan to run sub 10 seconds over the distance.

Cricket

Cricket started in Barbados around 1894, with the Barbados Cricket Association starting in 1933. Many Barbadians follow cricket religiously. Locally, cricket is governed by the Barbados Cricket Association (BCA). Barbados has a national team which takes part in the Regional Four Day Competition and the Regional Super 50, whereas the Barbados Royals is a franchise team in the Caribbean Premier League. Additionally, Barbados has players that are a composite part of the West Indies cricket team. Barbados has a number of famous cricketers including: Sir Garfield Sobers, Sir Everton Weekes, Sir Clyde Walcott, and Sir Frank Worrell. Cricket grounds include the Kensington Oval and the 3Ws Oval.

Basketball

Barbados' basketball team has a unique history of international accomplishments. It was the only Caribbean team that qualified for the 2006 Commonwealth Games and celebrated several surprising victories. Overall, the team finished 5th, leaving behind South Africa, Scotland and India.

Further, it is one of the few Caribbean teams that qualified for the FIBA Americas Championship.

Football

Kitesurfing and Windsurfing
Barbados is a popular destination for kitesurfing and Windsurfing. Wind is blowing most of the year, and its best at December to March. Barbados has great wave for kitesurfers and windsurfers, and there are no flat water spots. Main kite and windsurf beach is Silver Rock at the south tip of the island.

Rugby Union

Scouting and Guiding

Sport governing bodies
Archery – Barbados Archery Association (BAA)
Athletics (track and field) – Athletics Association of Barbados (AAB)
Badminton – Barbados Badminton Association (BBA)
Basketball – Barbados Amateur Basketball Association (BABA)
Bodybuilding – Barbados Amateur Body Building and Fitness Federation (BABBF)
Boxing – Amateur Boxing Association of Barbados (ABAB)
Cycling – Barbados Cycling Union (BCU)
Darts – Barbados Darts Association (BDA)
Equestrian – Barbados Equestrian Association (BEA)
Football – Barbados Football Association (BFA)
Golf – Barbados Golf Association (BGA)
Hockey – Barbados Hockey Federation (BHF)
Hockey (Ball) – Barbados Ball Hockey League (BBHL)
Horse Racing – Barbados Turf Club (BTC)
Polo – Barbados Polo Association (BPA)
Polo (Segway) – Barbados Segway Polo Association (SPCB)
Polo (Water) – Barbados Amateur Swimming Association (BASA)
Racing – Barbados Auto Racing League (BARL) Barbados Rally Club (BRC)
Road Tennis – Barbados (Professional) Road Tennis Association (BRTA)
Sailing – Barbados Sailing Association (BSA)
Squash – Barbados Squash Rackets Association (BSRA)
Tennis – Barbados Tennis Association (BTA)
Volleyball – Barbados Volleyball Association (BVA)

Stadiums in Barbados

See also
 Barbados at the Commonwealth Games
 Barbados at the Olympics
 Barbados at the Pan American Games
 Barbados at the Paralympics

References

External links
Sports tourism in Barbados: the development of sports facilities and special events, Yolande J. Elcock, Journal of Sport Tourism 10(2), 2005, 129–134
Sport in Barbados - Totally Barbados
Sport in Barbados - Barbados Tourism Encyclopaedia
Sports in Barbados - Official Website of Destination Barbados and Barbados Tourism Marketing, Inc